Jade Wiel (born 2 April 2000) is a French professional racing cyclist, who currently rides for UCI Women's WorldTeam . She won the 2019 French National Road Race Championships ahead of Victorie Guilman and Aude Biannic.

Major results
2019
1st  Road race, National Road Championships
2022
 5th Grand Prix Féminin de Chambéry

References

External links
 

2000 births
Living people
French female cyclists
Sportspeople from Aix-en-Provence
Cyclists from Provence-Alpes-Côte d'Azur